Day One is a short film directed and co-written by Henry Hughes with Dawn DeVoe. A woman who is on her first day of working as an interpreter for the United States Army is forced to deliver a baby for the wife of an enemy bomb maker. It was made as a thesis film at the AFI Conservatory.

In 2016, the movie was nominated for the Academy Award for Best Live Action Short Film at the 88th Academy Awards.

Awards and nominations

References

External links
 
 

2015 films
2015 drama films
2015 short films
American drama short films
2010s English-language films
2010s American films